Ingeborg Arvola (born 7 July 1974) is a Norwegian novelist and children's writer.

Career
Arvola made her literary debut in 1999 with the novel Korallhuset. Among her later novels are Straffe from 2003, Forsiktig glass from 2004, and 40 postkort from 2007. She was awarded the Cappelen Prize in 2004, and Havmannprisen in 2009. She received the Brage Prize in 2022, for her book Kniven i ilden. Ruijan rannalla – Sanger fra Ishavet.

Personal life
Arvola was born in Honningsvåg on 7 July 1974. She is a daughter of poet and translator Liv Lundberg.

References

1974 births
Living people
People from Nordkapp
20th-century Norwegian novelists
21st-century Norwegian novelists
Norwegian children's writers
Norwegian women novelists
Norwegian women children's writers
20th-century Norwegian women writers
21st-century Norwegian women writers